"Bend Ova" is a single by American rapper and producer Lil Jon released on July 22, 2014 as the follow-up to his highly successful single "Turn Down for What". The track features a guest verse by American rapper Tyga and was produced by Lil Jon and Australian DJ and producer Kronic.

Chart performance

Weekly charts

Year-end charts

References

2014 singles
Lil Jon songs
Song recordings produced by Lil Jon
Tyga songs
2014 songs
Songs written by Lil Jon
Columbia Records singles
Songs written by Tyga
Crunk songs